Prime Restaurants Inc. (formerly Prime Restaurant Royalty Income Fund) is a Canadian holding company, which operates the restaurant chains East Side Mario's, Tir Nan Og, Paddy Flaherty's, D'Arcy McGee's, Fionn MacCool's and Bier Markt.

Founded in Sudbury, Ontario, in 1980 as Yesac Creative Foods, the company became Prime Restaurants in 1989 when it merged with the Lime Rickey's chain based in Toronto. As of 2013 it is a wholly owned subsidiary of Recipe Unlimited.

See also
List of Canadian restaurant chains

References

External links
 Prime Restaurants
 Prime Pubs

Food and drink companies of Canada
Recipe Unlimited